The 2004 NatWest Series was a One Day International cricket tri-series sponsored by the National Westminster Bank that took place in England between 24 June and 10 July 2004. The series involved the national teams of England, New Zealand and the West Indies. Ten matches were played in total, with each team playing one another twice during the group stage. The teams which finished in the top two positions following the group stages qualified for the final, which New Zealand won by defeating the West Indies at Lord's on 10 July by 107 runs.

Venues

Squads

Fixtures

Final 

In the final at Lord's, West Indies won the toss and elected to field. On a slow Lord's pitch, New Zealand started their innings with a 120 run opening partnership between captain Stephen Fleming and Nathan Astle, before the former was dismissed by Dwayne Bravo for 67. Astle fell for 57 with the score on 143, with Bravo once again taking the dismissal. Scott Styris fell for a single run soon after, before Hamish Marshall and Craig McMillan came together to add 71 for the fourth wicket. Marshall eventually fell with the score on 217, dismissed by Chris Gayle, with McMillan being dismissed soon after by Tino Best, having made 52. A flurry of late wickets by Best and Ramnaresh Sarwan contained New Zealand's progress toward the end of the innings, with New Zealand all out after 49.2 overs for 266. Sarwan finished with the best innings bowling figures of 3/31, while Bravo and Best each chipped in with two wickets and Gayle and Devon Smith with one each. The West Indies response started poorly, with Gayle dismissed for 4 runs with the score on 5 by Jacob Oram. Devon Smith and Sarwan settled the batting with a sedate partnership of 40 for the second wicket, before Sarwan was run out. Brian Lara and Smith then took the score to 98, before the latter was run out by Daniel Vettori. Lara fell to the bowling of Vettori shortly after with the score on 105, with Bravo following one run later. Shivnarine Chanderpaul and Ricardo Powell took the score to 149, before Powell became the seventh wicket to fall. Devon Smith and Ridley Jacobs both fell with the score on 150, nine runs later Ian Bradshaw fell. Rain arrived and forced a ninety-minute delay, during which half of the Lord's crowd left. With the match seemingly headed for a reserve day, the rain stopped and play resumed with the West Indies on 159/9. No further runs were added as just after 8pm Vettori took the wicket of Chanderpaul, his fifth of the match, to hand New Zealand a 107 run victory. This was New Zealand's largest winning margin over the West Indies in One Day International's. Daniel Vettori was declared Man of the Match, while Stephen Fleming was declared Player of the Series.

Statistics

References

External links 
 2004 NatWest Series  at CricketArchive

2004 in English cricket
International cricket competitions in 2004
NatWest Group